FC BSK Spirovo was a Russian football team from Spirovo. It played professionally in the Russian Second Division from 2002 to 2004. Their best result was 7th place in West Zone in 2002.

External links
  Team history by footballfacts

Association football clubs established in 2001
Association football clubs disestablished in 2006
Defunct football clubs in Russia
Sport in Tver Oblast
2001 establishments in Russia
2006 disestablishments in Russia